In mathematics, an eigenform (meaning simultaneous Hecke eigenform with modular group SL(2,Z)) is a modular form which is an eigenvector for all Hecke operators Tm, m = 1, 2, 3, ....

Eigenforms fall into the realm of number theory, but can be found in other areas of math and science such as analysis, combinatorics, and physics. A common example of an eigenform, and the only non-cuspidal eigenforms, are the Eisenstein series. Another example is the Δ Function.

In second-order cybernetics, eigenforms are an example of a self-referential system.

Normalization 
There are two different normalizations for an eigenform (or for a modular form in general).

Algebraic normalization 
An eigenform is said to be normalized when scaled so that the q-coefficient in its Fourier series is one:

where q = e2πiz. As the function f is also an eigenvector under each Hecke operator Ti, it has a corresponding eigenvalue. More specifically ai, i ≥ 1 turns out to be the eigenvalue of f corresponding to the Hecke operator Ti. In the case when f is not a cusp form, the eigenvalues can be given explicitly.

Analytic normalization 
An eigenform which is cuspidal can be normalized with respect to its inner product:

Existence 
The existence of eigenforms is a nontrivial result, but does come directly from the fact that the Hecke algebra is commutative.

Higher levels 
In the case that the modular group is not the full SL(2,Z), there is not a Hecke operator for each n ∈ Z, and as such the definition of an eigenform is changed accordingly: an eigenform is a modular form which is a simultaneous eigenvector for all Hecke operators that act on the space.

In cybernetics 

In cybernetics, the notion of an eigenform is understood as an example of a reflexive system. It plays an important role in the work of Heinz von Foerster, and is "inextricably linked with second order cybernetics".

References

Modular forms
Cybernetics